The Company: A Novel of the CIA is an American novel written by Robert Littell and published by The Overlook Press in 2002. The plot interweaves the professional lives of both historical and fictional characters in the field of international espionage between June 1950 and August 1995.

The book was a New York Times bestseller and received wide critical acclaim.

It is the basis of a 2007 miniseries starring Michael Keaton, Chris O'Donnell, and Alfred Molina.

Notable historical characters 
The plot includes numerous characters based on historical persons, with varying degrees of verisimilitude.

The following is a list of the historical persons who speak or interact with other characters in the novel:

Martin Bormann (as Martin Dietrich)
Reinhard Gehlen
Yuri Andropov
Kim Philby
James Angleton
Lucian Truscott
William Colby
Richard Helms
James Reston
Dick Bissell
Llewellyn Thompson
Judith Campbell Exner
Allen Dulles
Dwight Eisenhower
Sam Giancana
Mikhail Gorbachev
E. Howard Hunt
Lyndon B. Johnson
John F. Kennedy
Joseph P. Kennedy, Sr.
Robert F. Kennedy
Nikita Khrushchev
Manuel Piñeiro
Johnny Roselli
Mstislav Rostropovich
Pope John Paul I
Frank Sinatra
Fidel Castro
Harry Truman
Frank Wisner
James Baker
Ronald Reagan
Bill Clark
Boris Yeltsin
William Casey
Vladimir Kryuchkov

In addition, William King Harvey does not appear by name, but the character "Harvey Torriti, a.k.a. the Sorcerer" is a very thinly-disguised version of Harvey.

References

External links 
 NPR's All Things Considered reviews The Company:

2002 American novels
American spy novels
Fiction books about the Central Intelligence Agency
Penguin Press books
The Overlook Press books